Corporation Food Hall is a food hall located in the Historic Core of Downtown Los Angeles, on Spring Street. Corporation Food Hall opened in August 2017. The food hall is located on the ground floor of the historic Corporation Building which was first built in 1915, and houses nine food stalls.

See also 

 Food hall
 Downtown Los Angeles, California

References

External links 

 

Shopping malls in Los Angeles
Los Angeles
Food halls
2017 establishments in California
Food markets in the United States